Gyula Madarász (3 May 1858 – 29 December 1931), also known as Julius von Madarász, was a Hungarian ornithologist and nature artist, who worked at the Hungarian National Museum.

Early life and education 
Born in Pest, Madarász came from a wealthy family of minor nobility. Because he was financially independent, he could devote his entire life to scientific work. He attended the University of Budapest, first studying medicine, and then zoology. In 1880, he completed a doctoral thesis on the anatomy of birds of the family Paridae.

Scientific career 
Starting in 1879, Madarász was an employee of the Hungarian National Museum. He worked there until his retirement in 1915, ultimately serving as the director of the ornithology department. During his tenure, he vastly increased the size of the collection through his own efforts and through purchases. Madarász travelled to every part of Hungary over the course of his career, and authored a number of authoritative works on the birds of central Europe. At Lake Fertő, he regularly observed avian migrations. In 1881, he created a checklist of the birds of Hungary. In 1884, he founded the German-language ornithological journal Zeitschrift für die gesamte Ornithologie, which he published and edited for five years, as well as contributing to the wealth of illustrations that it contained. From 1894 to 1893, he published Magyarország Madarai, a comprehensive and well-illustrated encyclopedia of Hungarian birds, that remained an important reference for decades.

Madarász also undertook collecting trips and expeditions around western Europe, Asia, Africa, and South America, making him one of the first Hungarian ornithologists to extend his studies beyond the local avifauna. On an 1895–96 expedition to Ceylon, he collected specimens of at least 125 species. In 1911–12, he travelled through Sudan to the Blue Nile, but he had to cut the trip short when he came down with malaria. He published a monograph entitled The Birds of Cyprus in 1904, and wrote several publications cataloging the birds collected by an expedition led by Sámuel Fenichel and Lajos Bíró in New Guinea. He described several species collected by him and by other ornithologists, among these species the green-breasted pitta and Szechenyi's monal-partridge. In total, he published over 150 ornithological works. Madarász was a Foreign Member of the British Ornithologists' Union and a Corresponding Fellow of the American Ornithologists' Union.

A species of bird, Madarasz's tiger parrot (Psittacella madaraszi), was named after Gyula Madarász by Adolf Bernhard Meyer in 1886.

Artistic work 

Madarász was tutored in painting by Antal Ligeti, who also worked at the Hungarian National Museum. Madarász's landscape paintings and paintings of animals were exhibited in the National Salon and National Art Gallery in Budapest, and he also mostly illustrated his ornithological articles and books himself.

References

External links 

1858 births
1931 deaths
People from Pest, Hungary
Hungarian ornithologists
19th-century Hungarian painters
20th-century Hungarian painters
Hungarian male painters
19th-century Hungarian male artists
20th-century Hungarian male artists